Woodbridge High School is a four-year comprehensive public high school located in Woodbridge Township, in Middlesex County, New Jersey, serving students in ninth through twelfth grades as part of the Woodbridge Township School District. The high school is one of three in the district, together with Colonia High School and John F. Kennedy Memorial High School. The school has been accredited by the Middle States Association of Colleges and Schools Commission on Elementary and Secondary Schools since 1928.

As of the 2021–22 school year, the school had an enrollment of 1,577 students and 131.6 classroom teachers (on an FTE basis), for a student–teacher ratio of 12.0:1. There were 415 students (26.3% of enrollment) eligible for free lunch and 101 (6.4% of students) eligible for reduced-cost lunch.

Awards, recognition and rankings
The school was the 159th-ranked public high school in New Jersey out of 339 schools statewide in New Jersey Monthly magazine's September 2014 cover story on the state's "Top Public High Schools", using a new ranking methodology. The school had been ranked 170th in the state of 328 schools in 2012, after being ranked 229th in 2010 out of 322 schools listed. The magazine ranked the school 231st in 2008 out of 316 schools. The school was ranked 222nd in the magazine's September 2006 issue, which surveyed 316 schools across the state. Schooldigger.com ranked the school tied for 40th out of 381 public high schools statewide in its 2011 rankings (a decrease of 14 positions from the 2010 ranking) which were based on the combined percentage of students classified as proficient or above proficient on the mathematics (93.8%) and language arts literacy (97.3%) components of the High School Proficiency Assessment (HSPA).

History 
The current Woodbridge High School was occupied in 1956 and built adjacent to the then new modern football stadium. The old stadium (Legion Field) was vacated to make way for the southbound lanes of the New Jersey Turnpike. Prior to 1957, the high school was located on Barron and Grove Avenue, which is the current site of the Woodbridge Middle School. It operated on split sessions for many years: Freshmen and Sophomores attended school in the afternoon; Juniors and Seniors in the morning. The last graduating class of the Barron Avenue "Woodbridge High School" was 1956.

The first school building was erected in 1876 in Woodbridge Township, and was designated PS 1.  It was located on School Street in Woodbridge Proper.  
The school was built on a budget of $25,000.00. The head mason was William B. Van Voast of New Brunswick, New Jersey. The carpentry work was done by Manning & Rudolph, of Plainfield, C. Graham & Son, of Elizabeth, New Jersey, architects. The clock, bell, and bell tower have since been removed, along with other renovations that have been done to the building. The bell now resides at Parker Press Park. The names of the mentioned mason and carpenters are embossed on the bell, along with other names. 
Classes started in January 1877.
High school class were first conducted in PS 1.  The building now houses the Woodbridge Board of Education.
In 1883, the first high school students graduated.  There were two graduates.
In 1911, high school classes were conducted in the then new building on Barron Avenue.  This building now houses Woodbridge Middle School.
In 1948, a football field and stadium building was constructed on the site of an old wooden surfaced auto racetrack called the 'Woodbridge Speedway'.  It was dedicated as 'The Stadium'.  The field was re-dedicated 'Nick Priscoe Field' in the 1970s after a longtime former head football coach.
In 1956, the current Woodbridge HS building was erected and 'Kelly Street' ran through the HS property.  The roadway was later renamed 'Samuel Lupo Place" in the 1980s after another head football coach.
In 1956, WHS graduated 317 students, the final class to graduate from the Barron Avenue building.

Athletics
The Woodbridge High School Barrons compete in the Greater Middlesex Conference, which is comprised of public and private high schools in the Middlesex County area and operates under the supervision of the New Jersey State Interscholastic Athletic Association (NJSIAA). With 1,052 students in grades 10-12, the school was classified by the NJSIAA for the 2019–20 school year as Group III for most athletic competition purposes, which included schools with an enrollment of 761 to 1,058 students in that grade range. The football team competes in Division 4 of the Big Central Football Conference, which includes 60 public and private high schools in Hunterdon, Middlesex, Somerset, Union and Warren counties, which are broken down into 10 divisions by size and location. The school was classified by the NJSIAA as Group IV North for football for 2022–2024.

Together with John F. Kennedy Memorial High School, the school participates in a cooperative ice hockey program with Colonia High School as the host school / lead agency, under an agreement scheduled to expire at the end of the 2023–24 school year.

The football team has won 12 conference / division titles, and nine state championships: 1930, 1938, 1939, 1960, 1970 and 1971 before the playoff era, and won the Central Jersey Group IV sectional title in 1980, 1993 and 1997. The 1980 team won the Central Jersey Group IV state sectional title with a 7-6 win in the championship game against Raritan High School.

The 1975 boys' basketball team finished with a 29-2 record after winning the Group IV state championship, defeating Eastside Paterson by a score of 73-58 in the title game, the program's first tournament final.

Boys' and girls' bowling team have won 15 state championships between the two. The boys' team won the overall team title in 1981, 1983 and 1992, and won the Group III state championship in 2007, 2011, 2012, 2018 and 2019; The eight state titles are the most for any team in the state. The team won the Tournament of Champions in 2012 and 2018. The girls' bowling team won the overall state championship in 1989, 1993, 1998, 1999, 2001 and 2006, and won the Group III state title and the Tournament of Champions in 2007. The seven titles won by the girls' team are the second most in the state. The 1993 team finished as overall state champion in 2001 with 2,653 pins, five ahead of second-place Central Regional High School with 2,648.

The softball team won the Group IV state championship in 1978, defeating Westfield High School, and were runners up in 1979 when they lost to Ridgewood High School.

The boys' shuttle hurdle relay team won the Group IV state championship in 1995 with the fastest time in the state, 31.27 seconds.

Administration
The school's principal is Glenn Lottmann. His core administration team includes the two vice principals.

Notable alumni

 Percy Edgar Brown, (1885–1937), soil scientist at Iowa State University, best known for the book, Soils of Iowa
 Erik Christensen (born 1931), wide receiver who played for the Washington Redskins. Christensen attended Woodbridge High School before transferring to Fork Union Military Academy.
 Lou Creekmur (born 1927), offensive lineman (eight Pro Bowl appearances) with the Detroit Lions, inducted into the Pro Football Hall of Fame in 1996.
 Libell Duran, Miss New Jersey USA 2013.
 Edward M. Hundert (born 1957), medical ethicist.
 Jack H. Jacobs (born 1945, class of 1962), Medal of Honor Recipient, awarded 1969.
 Kyle Johnson (born 1978, class of 1996), fullback with the Denver Broncos.
 Michael Jones (born 1987), actor and internet personality.
 Pat Lamberti (1937–2007), American football linebacker who played for the New York Titans and Denver Broncos in 1961.
 Praise Martin-Oguike (born 1993), American football defensive end who played in the XFL for the Seattle Dragons.
 Jack Protz (born 1948), American football linebacker who played for the San Diego Chargers in 1970.
 Dawn Marie Psaltis (born 1970), former female professional wrestler and WWE Diva.
 Richie Sambora (born 1959), former lead guitarist of the rock band Bon Jovi who was honored by having the street leading to the school named "Richie Sambora Way".
 Tommy Thompson (1927-1990), American football linebacker and center who played for the Cleveland Browns in the All-America Football Conference and the NFL in the late 1940s and early 1950s.

References

External links 
Woodbridge High School website

School Data for the Woodbridge Township School District, National Center for Education Statistics
 Woodbridge HS Football Program - Official Web Site

1956 establishments in New Jersey
Educational institutions established in 1956
Public high schools in Middlesex County, New Jersey
School buildings completed in 1956
Woodbridge Township, New Jersey